This is a list of seasons played by Galway United F.C.  the League of Ireland It details the club's achievements in major competitions, and the top scorers for each season.

Seasons

 2 points for a win up to and including 1992/93 season.
 League of Ireland contained only one tier until the 1984/85 season.

Key

 P = Played
 W = Games won
 D = Games drawn
 L = Games lost
 F = Goals for
 A = Goals against
 Pts = Points
 Pos = Final position

 Div 1 = League of Ireland First Division
 Prem = League of Ireland Premier Division

 F = Final
 SF = Semi-finals
 QF = Quarter-finals

 GR = Regional Group Stage
 R1 = Round 1
 R2 = Round 2
 R3 = Round 3
 R4 = Round 4

Notes and references

 
Galway United
Galway United